María Dolores Dueñas Navarro (born 6 October 1971) better known as Lola Dueñas is a Spanish actress.

Born in Madrid, she is the daughter of Nicolás Dueñas and studied in the Teatro de La Abadía of Madrid. She decided to relocate to Paris, France, in 2011.

Filmography

Feature film 
Mensaka (Salvador García Ruíz, 1998)
Marta y alrededores (Nacho Pérez de la Paz and Jesús Ruiz, 1999)
Las razones de mis amigos (Gerardo Herrero, 2000)
Terca Vida (Fernando Huertas, 2000)
Todo me pasa a mí (Miquel García Borda, 2001)
Piedras (Ramón Salazar, 2002)
Hable con ella (Pedro Almodóvar, 2002)
Días de fútbol (David Serrano, 2003)
Mar adentro (Alejandro Amenábar, 2004)
20 centímetros (Ramón Salazar, 2005)
Volver (Pedro Almodóvar, 2006)
Lo que sé de Lola (Javier Rebollo, 2006)
Fuera de carta (Nacho G. Velilla, 2008)
Los abrazos rotos (Pedro Almodóvar, 2009)
Yo Tambien (Alvaro Pastor and Antonio Naharro, 2009)
Angel & Tony (Alix Delaporte, 2010)
Les femmes du 6e étage (Philippe Le Guay, 2010)
Sin ella (Jorge Colón, 2010)
10.000 noches en ninguna parte (2013)
Los amantes pasajeros (Pedro Almodóvar, 2013)
Suzanne (Katell Quillévéré, 2013)
 Os fenómenos (Alfonso Zarauza, 2014)
Alléluia (Fabrice du Welz, 2014)
Tiens-toi droite (Katia Lewkowicz, 2014)
 Les Ogres (Léa Fehner, 2015)
 Incidencias (José Corbacho and Juan Cruz, 2015)
 La fille du patron (Olivier Loustau, 2015)
 No sé decir adiós (Lino Escalera, 2017)
 Zama (Lucrecia Martel, 2017)
 Viaje al cuarto de una madre (Celia Rico, 2018)
 Love Me Not (Lluís Miñarro, 2019)

Television 
A mi moda (movie, 1997)
Periodistas (series, 1998, 1 episode) 
Entre naranjos (miniseries, 1998) 
Policías, en el corazón de la calle (series, 2000-2002, 66 episodes)
Aída (series, 2012, 3 episodes)
Instinto (series, 2019)
Veneno (series, 2020, 3 episodes)

Awards 
 Cannes Film Festival
 2006: Best Actress together with the rest of actresses of Volver
 Goya Awards
 2004: Goya Award for Best Actress for Mar adentro
 2006: Nominated to Goya Award for Best Supporting Actress for Volver
 2009: Goya Award for Best Actress for Yo También
 Actors and Actresses Union Awards
 1998: Mejor interpretación revelación (Best breakthrough performance) for Mensaka
 2000: Nominated for Mejor interpretación secundaria de televisión (Best supporting actress in a TV production) for Policías, en el corazón de la calle
 2004: Mejor actriz secundaria de cine (Best supporting actress in a film production) for Mar adentro
 2006: Nominated for Mejor actriz secundaria de cine (Best supporting actress in a film production) for Volver
 2009: Mejor actriz protagonista de cine (Best actress in a film production for Yo, también
 2009: Nominated for Mejor actriz de reparto de cine (Best supporting actress in a film production) for Los abrazos rotos
 Fotogramas de Plata
 2000: Nominated for Premio de mejor actriz de televisión (Best actress in a TV production) for Policías, en el corazón de la calle

References

External links

1971 births
Living people
Actresses from Madrid
Spanish film actresses
Spanish telenovela actresses
20th-century Spanish actresses
21st-century Spanish actresses
Best Actress Goya Award winners
Cannes Film Festival Award for Best Actress winners
Chicas Almodóvar